Tunasan is a barangay in Muntinlupa, Philippines. It is the southernmost barangay of Metro Manila located in the southern section of the city bordering the province of Laguna. According to the 2020 census, it has a population of 61,374.

It is bounded by Poblacion, Muntinlupa on the north, Laguna de Bay on the east, the San Pedro barangays of San Antonio and Cuyab on the south; the Las Piñas barangay of Almanza Uno on the west; and Dasmariñas barangay of Salapan, province of Cavite, on the southwest.

Etymology
Tunasan got its name from a medicinal plant locally called tunas (Nymphaea nouchali), which was abundant on the Tunasan River and the shoreline of Laguna de Bay.

There are also three legends or myths that possibly explain the origin of Tunasan's name:
 Tunasan was apparently named after Datu Tuna Asomal, who was registered as the landowner of the area according to a document of ownership called Torrens Title. His father Datu Manaplo founded the present-day settlement as Bagbagan in the mid-13th century as they settled here upon docking at Laguna de Bay from Panay and Ancient Tondo (present-day Manila). Bagbagan was said to be later renamed as Tunasan in 1735.
According to old folks, Tunasan was a haven of hardened criminals and pirates (Tagalog: tulisan), hence it was called as such.
According to a legend, when the Americans stocked their tuna sardines in the area, the people hide them. Every time they eat, they send an errand boy to get some and he would ask “where?” (Tagalog: s'an, shortened term of saan). Being so repeatedly at the passage of time, the term Tuna-san was coined which became the name of the place.

History
Tunasan was called "Tunasancillo" during the Spanish colonial period and it was a barrio and also a part of the vast hacienda owned by the Augustinian Recollects in the pueblo or town of San Pedro Tunasan in the province of La Laguna. San Pedro Tunasan was later annexed to the town of Biñan in 1903. Eventually, the barrio became part of Muntinlupa, which was then a municipio of the province of Rizal when the town of San Pedro Tunasan sold it in 1907 during the American period. After the separation, the town of San Pedro Tunasan simply changed its name to San Pedro and the sold barangay of Tunasancillo was called Tunasan.

Subdivisions

While barangays are the administrative divisions of the city, and are legally part of the addresses of establishments and homes, residents also include their subdivision. Listed below are subdivisions in this barangay.

 Abbey Place
 Aguila Village
 Brazilia Heights Subdivision
 Camella Homes 3
 Camella Homes Ridgeview I Subdivision
 Camella Homes Ridgeview II Subdivision
 JPA Subdivision
 Lake Shore Subdivision
 Lindenwood Residences
 Lodora Subdivision
 Midland II Subdivision
 Parkhomes Subdivision
 Sto. Niño Village
 Susana Heights Subdivision
 Teosejo Industrial Complex
 Teosejo Subdivision
 Victoria Homes Subdivision
 Villa Carolina I
 Villa Carolina II

Laguerta Compound
SM Development Corporation donated an  property in Laguerta, Barangay Tunasan for residential use . Several government offices and buildings are also in this area.
 Department of Education - Muntinlupa
 Tunasan National High School
 Muntinlupa City Health Office
 Muntinlupa City Police Headquarters
 Museo ng Muntinlupa
 Bulilit Center

Tunasan Baywalk
The Tunasan Baywalk is a reclaimed area behind the Muntinlupa Science High School where the Muntinlupa Sports Complex is located.

See also
 Tunasan River

References

External links
http://muntinlupacity.gov.ph/

Muntinlupa
Barangays of Metro Manila